was a Quasi-National Park on the Pacific coast of northern Miyagi Prefecture, Japan. Established in 1979, the park extended along 180 km of the coast of southern Sanriku and encompassed Mount Kinka. On 31 March 2015, in the aftermath of the 2011 Tōhoku earthquake and tsunami, the Park was incorporated into Sanriku Fukkō National Park.

Related municipalities
 Ishinomaki, Kesennuma, Minamisanriku, Onagawa, Tome

See also
 National Parks of Japan

References

External links

  Map of the Natural Parks of Miyagi Prefecture
  Detailed maps of the Natural Parks of Miyagi Prefecture

National parks of Japan
Parks and gardens in Miyagi Prefecture
Protected areas established in 1979
1979 establishments in Japan